Øyvind S. Berg (1943-2008) was an international speedway rider from Norway.

Speedway career 
Berg was a five times runner-up in the Norwegian Championship in 1967, 1968, 1969, 1976 and 1977.

He rode in the top tier of British Speedway from 1967 until 1974, riding for various clubs.

World Final appearances

World Pairs Championship
 1968 -  Kempten (with Odd Fossengen) - 3rd - 16pts (11)
* Unofficial World Championships.

References 

1943 births
2008 deaths
Norwegian speedway riders
Edinburgh Monarchs riders
Glasgow Tigers riders
Oxford Cheetahs riders
Poole Pirates riders
Norwegian expatriate sportspeople in England
People from Askim
Sportspeople from Viken (county)